North Hwanghae Province (Hwanghaebuk-to; , lit. "north Yellow Sea province") is a province of North Korea.  The province was formed in 1954 when the former Hwanghae Province was split into North and South Hwanghae.  The provincial capital is Sariwon.  The province is bordered by Pyongyang and South Pyongan to the north, Kangwon to the east, Kaesong Industrial Region and South Korea's Gyeonggi Province to the south, and South Hwanghae southwest.  In 2003, Kaesong Directly Governed City (Kaesong Chikhalsi) became part of North Hwanghae as Kaepung County. Later on in 2019, it was promoted as Special City (Kaesong T'ŭkpyŏlsi). Thus, it was separated from North Hwanghae.

Administrative divisions
North Hwanghae is divided into 2 cities ("si") and 18 counties ("kun").  Three of these counties (Chunghwa, Kangnam, and Sangwon) were added to the province in 2010 after being split from Pyongyang. However, Kangnam was returned to Pyongyang in 2011.

Cities
 Sariwon (capital)  사리원시/
 Songrim  송림시/

Counties

Transportation
North Hwanghae is connected to the rest of the country by way of the Pyongbu Railway Line (known in South Korea as the Kyongui Line), which, in theory, runs from Pyongyang to Pusan; however, in reality, the line is cut short by the Korean Demilitarized Zone. It is also served by several large highways, most notably the Pyongyang-Kaesong Motorway.

Education
There are several higher-level educational institutions in North Hwanghae, all government-run. These include the Kye Ung Sang Sariwon University of Agriculture, the Sariwon University of Geology, and the Sariwon Teachers University.

Culture

Historic landmarks
North Hwanghae has many historical relics as the site of the Koryo-dynasty capital at Kaesong, a depository for many famous historic relics. The province is also home to the tombs of many of the Koryo monarchs, the most famous being the tombs of kings Taejo and Kongmin, though others are spread throughout Kaesong and Kaepung county. Kaesong also houses the Koguryo-era Taehungsan Fortress, built to protect the kingdom's capital at Pyongyang and enclosing the famous Kwanum Temple. Nearby to Sariwin is the famous Jongbangsan Fortress, another Koguryo satellite for the defense of Pyongyang. This fortress encompasses the 9th-century Songbulsa Buddhist temple, one of the oldest and most picturesque in the country.

References

External links
 행정 구역 현황 (Haengjeong Guyeok Hyeonhwang) (in Korean only)
 http://nk.joins.com/map/i223.htm
 https://web.archive.org/web/20110609223701/http://www.kcna.co.jp/item/2006/200605/news05/11.htm

 
Provinces of North Korea
States and territories established in 1954
1954 establishments in North Korea